Dimitris Gkaras (born ) is a Greek male volleyball player. He is part of the Greece men's national volleyball team. On club level he last played for Olympiacos.

Sporting achievements

Clubs
 National championships
 2014/2015  Greek Championship, with PAOK
 2014/2015  Greek Cup, with PAOK
 2015/2016  Greek Championship, with PAOK
 2016/2017  Greek Championship, with PAOK
 2021/2022  Greek Championship, with Panathinaikos
 2021/2022  Greek League Cup, with Panathinaikos

 CEV Competitions
2022–23  CEV Challenge Cup, with Olympiacos Piraeus

References

External links
 profile at FIVB.org

1985 births
Living people
Greek men's volleyball players
A.C. Orestias players
PAOK V.C. players
Panathinaikos V.C. players
Volleyball players from Orestiada